The 1995 World Table Tennis Championships women's doubles was the 42nd edition of the women's doubles championship.
Deng Yaping and Qiao Hong defeated Liu Wei and Qiao Yunping in the final by three sets to one.

Results

See also
List of World Table Tennis Championships medalists

References

-
World
Tab